Till We Meet Again is a 1944 American drama film directed by Frank Borzage, written by Lenore J. Coffee, and starring Ray Milland, Barbara Britton, Walter Slezak, Lucile Watson, Konstantin Shayne, Vladimir Sokoloff and Mona Freeman. It was released on August 30, 1944, by Paramount Pictures.

Plot

Cast 
Ray Milland as John
Barbara Britton as Sister Clothilde / Louise Dupree
Walter Slezak as Vitrey
Lucile Watson as Mother Superior
Konstantin Shayne as Major Krupp
Vladimir Sokoloff as Cabeau
Mona Freeman as Elise
William Edmunds as Henri Maret

Radio adaptation
Till We Meet Again was presented on the Kate Smith Hour September 24, 1944. Jeanne Cagney and Franchot Tone starred in the adaptation.

References

External links 
 
 

 A WWII pilot (Milland)with vital information for the allies is shot down in Nazi occupied France. A young nun(Britton)sacrifices to help him escape.

1944 films
American drama films
Films directed by Frank Borzage
Films about shot-down aviators
Films scored by David Buttolph
Films set in France
Paramount Pictures films
World War II films made in wartime
American black-and-white films
1944 drama films
1940s English-language films